"Locker Room" (formerly "Larry McCarren's Locker Room") is a live talk show hosted by WFRV-TV sports director Burke Griffin and former Green Bay Packer Ahman Green. It used to be hosted by former WFRV sports director and former Green Bay Packer Larry McCarren, who is now the sports director at WGBA-TV. Every week during football season, a Packers player visits the show. That player is then interviewed, and then that player must teach one selected member of the audience how to do a task to earn their autograph; the concept is called "Earn Your Autograph."  Also, there is a segment on the show called "Chalk Talk," where certain plays are selected in the previous Packer game and are talked through.

Band
The official band of "Locker Room" is 3rd and Short.

2012 hiatus
In March 2012, Larry McCarren announced that he was resigning from his 24-year position at WFRV-TV. He proceeded to join WGBA-TV in July 2012, launching the similar show Packers Live in September 2013 over the stations in the Packers' television network (McCarren did not do a show in the 2012 season due to a non-compete clause in the Green Bay market). In August 2012, WFRV announced it had found two new co-hosts for McCarren's former show, Burke Griffin and Ahman Green; the new show will premiere on September 10.

Notes

Mass media in Green Bay, Wisconsin